Exochocepheus eremitus is a species of mite in the family Scutoverticidae.

References

Acariformes
Articles created by Qbugbot
Animals described in 1968